Intermediair is a Dutch website for "higher educated professionals in the fields of management, consulting, personnel counselling, financial administration and controlling, and law."

History and profile
Intermediair was launched in 1965. The magazine is owned by De Persgroep. It was published by the VNU Media on a weekly basis and is based in Amsterdam. 

In 2010 Intermediair had a circulation of 191.644 copies. In 2012 Intermediair ceased to exist on paper, and went digital only.

Since 2018 the weekly digital magazine was discontinued. The website nowadays publishes articles piecemeal. A newsletter by email is available upon request.

The focus continues to be general career advice, contemporary management practices and a database of job vacancies.

References

External links

World Cat info

1965 establishments in the Netherlands
2012 disestablishments in the Netherlands
Business magazines published in the Netherlands
Defunct magazines published in the Netherlands
Dutch-language magazines
Magazines established in 1965
Magazines disestablished in 2012
Magazines published in Amsterdam
Online magazines with defunct print editions
Weekly magazines published in the Netherlands